Virgil Corey (September 23, 1916 – July 27, 2008) was an American politician who served in the Iowa House of Representatives from 1979 to 1989.

He died on July 27, 2008, in Wapello, Iowa at age 91.

References

1916 births
2008 deaths
Republican Party members of the Iowa House of Representatives
People from Louisa County, Iowa
20th-century American politicians